Ochrota is a genus of moths in the subfamily Arctiinae erected by Carl Heinrich Hopffer in 1898.

Species
Some species of this genus are:
Ochrota arida (Toulgoët, 1955)
Ochrota asuraeformis (Strand, 1912)
Ochrota bicoloria Toulgoët, 1958
Ochrota convergens Toulgoët, 1956
Ochrota dissimilis Toulgoët, 1956
Ochrota malagassa (Strand, 1912)
Ochrota nigrolimbata Toulgoët, 1965
Ochrota nyassa (Strand, 1912)
Ochrota septentrionalis Toulgoët, 1956
Ochrota unicolor (Hopffer, 1857)

Formerly placed here
Ochrota bipuncta (Hampson, 1900)

References

Lithosiini